Mary D. Watkins (born 1939, Denver, Colorado) is an American composer and pianist in jazz and  classical music.

Watkins graduated from Howard University in 1972 and began performing in jazz ensembles in Washington, D.C. shortly after. Watkins released several full-length albums and composed commissioned works for jazz ensembles, including a score for the play Lady Lester Sings the Blues and a jazz version of The Nutcracker ballet.

Discography
 Something Moving (Olivia, 1978)
 Winds of Change (Palo Alto, 1981)
 Spirit Song (Redwood, 1985)
 The Soul Kings (Wenefil, 1992)
 Touch Heal & Deliver (DDS, 1995)
 Watkins' Five Movements in Color and Wilson's Of Visions and Truth: A Song Cycle, performed by the New Black Music Repertory Ensemble. (Center for Black Music Research, and Albany Records, 2010)

References

American women composers
African-American women composers
African-American composers
20th-century American composers
Songwriters from Colorado
Musicians from Colorado
1939 births
Living people
20th-century American women pianists
20th-century American pianists
21st-century American women pianists
21st-century American pianists
20th-century women composers
Howard University alumni
African-American songwriters
African-American pianists
African-American women musicians
20th-century African-American women
20th-century African-American musicians
21st-century African-American women
21st-century African-American musicians